Aegomorphus clavipes is a species of beetle belonging to the family Cerambycidae.

It is native to Eurasia.

References

Aegomorphus